Eucalyptus brachyandra, commonly known as the tropical red box, is a straggly tree, mallee or shrub and is endemic to north-western Australia. It has rough, fibrous to stringy bark on the trunk and smooth grey to white bark on the smaller branches. Mature trees have elliptic to oblong or egg-shaped leaves, tiny flower buds in groups of three or seven, creamy white flowers and cup-shaped, bell-shaped or urn-shaped fruit. It grows in the Kimberley region of Western Australia and the Top End of the Northern Territory.

Description
The bark is rough, fibrous to stringy on the trunk and sometimes on the larger branches and smooth, grey to white above. The opposite sides of the leaves are a different shade of dull, pale green. Flowering mainly occurs from August to November and the flowers are creamy white.

Taxonomy and naming
Eucalyptus brachyandra was first formally described by the botanist Ferdinand von Mueller in 1859 from a specimen "on the rocky slopes of the upper Victoria River" and the description was published in the Journal of the Proceedings of the Linnean Society, Botany. The specific epithet (brachyandra) is derived from the ancient Greek words brachys (βραχύς), meaning "short" and anēr, genitive andros (ἀνήρ, genitive ἀνδρός), meaning "male", possibly referring to the short stamens.

Distribution and habitat
Tropical red box is found on rocky sites or in rock fissures in the Kimberley region of Western Australia growing in sandy skeletal soils over sandstone or quartzite. It is also found in the north west of the Northern Territory from south of Darwin, Northern Territory extending south west from the Tabletop Range through the Victoria River catchment area to the Western Australian border. Its usual habitat is on sandstone plateaus and ridge tops.

Conservation
Eucalyptus brachyandra is classified as "not threatened" by the Western Australian Government Department of Parks and Wildlife.

See also

List of Eucalyptus species

References

Eucalypts of Western Australia
Trees of Australia
brachyandra
Myrtales of Australia
Plants described in 1859
Taxa named by Ferdinand von Mueller